The Christian Democratic Party of Cuba (abbreviated PDC) is a Christian Democratic political party in Cuba affiliated with the Centrist Democrat International (Spanish: Internacional Demócrata de Centro – IDC), the Christian Democratic Organization of America (Spanish Organización Demócrata Cristiana de América – ODCA) and the Union of Latin American Parties (ULAP).

The Christian Democratic Party (CD) of Cuba is the longest-standing political party founded on the island. Its origins date back to 1959 when José Ignacio Rasco founded the Christian Democratic Movement in Cuba, inspired by Christian humanism, officially becoming a political party in Miami, Florida, in 1991, as a result of a merger between the Christian Democratic Movement and several other organizations defending similar values and principles, which operated in exile due to the prevailing repression in Cuba. Although changes to the Cuban constitution in 1992 decriminalized the act of forming political parties other than the Communist Party, none of the parties (Communist Party included) are permitted to campaign or engage in any public political activities on the island. The new Constitution of 2019 eliminated that option to limit it to the formation of "mass and social organizations" dedicated "to the tasks of building, consolidating and defending the socialist society" (Article 14).

The president of the Christian Democratic Party of Cuba up to 2014 was a Cuban exile Marcelino Miyares Sotolongo and the international secretary was José Ignacio Rasco, also in exile. Rasco founded the Cuban Christian Democratic Movement in 1959. He was a professor, writer, and columnist. In addition, he was President of the Jacques Maritain Institute of Cuba and also President of Editorial Cubana.

In May 2014, the party held its XIII Congress in Miami, in which René Hernández was elected president.

On Saturday, June 2, 2018, Dr. Andrés Hernández Amor was elected President , accompanied by a team made up of three vice presidents: Héctor Caraballo, Enix Berrio Sardá, and René Hernández. Special recognition was given during the Congress to the entry into the board of Enix Berrio Sardá, an economist and sociologist, resident in Havana, who has also been a spokesperson for the Democratic Action Unity Table (MUAD), a well-known opposition group to the Cuban regime.

The PDC, among other postulates, advocates the establishment of a rule of law based on full respect for public freedoms and human rights and the construction of a prosperous and fair society based on the implementation of a Social Market Economy.

The party's manifesto, (created in Miami 1991) states; "We have made the decision to found the Christian Democratic Party of Cuba because we wish to offer a political alternative to our mother country in the fight for human rights, economic development and social justice within a democratic and pluralistic framework." The party invokes the legacy of José Martí and Simón Bolívar, whom they say "conceived Latin America as a brotherhood of shared, common and sovereign nations." The Christian Democratic Party of Cuba are publicly against all foreign intervention in Cuba, and declares its opposition to the United States embargo.

See also 

 List of political parties in Cuba

References

External links

Political parties established in 1959
Catholic political parties
Christian democratic parties in North America
Christian socialist organizations
Opposition to Fidel Castro
Political parties in Cuba
Socialist parties in Cuba